Shapingba is a metro station of the Chongqing Rail Transit system in Shapingba District, Chongqing Municipality, China. The station began service on 28 July 2011 with the opening of Line 1 of Chongqing Rail Transit. Until the extension to Daxuecheng was completed and opened in 2012, it operated as the terminus of Line 1. It later was expanded to accommodate two extra metro lines to the south of the Line 1 metro station, to serve the Loop Line (opened on December 28, 2018) and Line 9 (opened on January 25, 2022), but the transfer passage didn't open until 30 September 2022. Line 27, which is currently under construction, will also serve the station in future.

It also interchanges with the renovated Shapingba railway station, as an Integrated Transport Hub, with connected bus and taxi modes.

Station structure

Line 1
The station serves as the 14th station on the East-West running Line 1. This is an underground station on two levels. The first underground level is for the station hall & ticketing, beneath which is the platform level. The station set up to serve 2 tracks from a single island platform.

Line 9
Shapingba is the 4th station on this line which runs from the Southwest to the Northeast of the city.

Loop Line
This is a circular metro line.

Station Exits
 Exit 1: Chongqing Normal University (Shapingba Campus), Chongqing Nankai Middle School
 Exit 2: Sanxia Square Pedestrian Street
 Exit 3: Shapingba railway station, Chongqing VIII Middle School

Near the Station
 Chongqing Normal University (Shapingba campus)
 Chongqing First Secondary School
 Chongqing Nankai High School
 Chongqing VIII Secondary School
 Chongqing Shu Shu Primary School
 Chongqing Shapingba District People's Hospital
 Shapingba District Cultural Museum
 Sanxia Square Pedestrian Street
 Shapingba railway station
 Sanxia Square Underground Commercial Street

References

Railway stations in China opened in 2011
Chongqing Rail Transit stations
Shapingba District